American Motorcycle Association v. Superior Court,  (1978), was a case decided by the Supreme Court of California that first adopted a comparative fault regime for apportionment of liability among multiple tortfeasors for negligence in California.

See also
California Tort Claims Act
Law of California

References

External links
 

Negligence case law
1978 in United States case law
United States tort case law
1978 in California
California state case law
American Motorcyclist Association